Cancún Declaration may refer to:

 the FAO Declaration of the International Conference on Responsible Fishing (6–8 May 1992), that established the principles of Monitoring control and surveillance
 the Cancún Declaration of Like-Minded Megadiversity Countries (18 February 2002)
 the ministerial declaration adopted on the World Trade Organization Ministerial Conference of 2003 at Cancun
 the Cancun Declaration of the Latin American and Caribbean Unity Summit (February 2010), for the establishment of the Community of Latin American and Caribbean States (CELAC)

See also 
 Cancun conference (disambiguation)

Agreements
Government documents
Government statements
Cancún